Herbert Farrant Reed (10 September 1865 – 9 March 1911) was an English cricketer who appeared in eight first-class matches between 1882 and 1885. He played primarily for Somerset County Cricket Club, but also appeared once for the Marylebone Cricket Club.

References

1865 births
1911 deaths
English cricketers
Marylebone Cricket Club cricketers
Somerset cricketers
Sportspeople from Taunton